Pavel Holubář (born June 7, 1970 in Brno) is a Czech sprint canoer who competed in the early 2000s.

At the 2000 Summer Olympics in Sydney, he was eliminated in the semifinals of both the K-2 500 m and the K-4 1000 m events.

References

1970 births
Canoeists at the 2000 Summer Olympics
Czech male canoeists
Living people
Olympic canoeists of the Czech Republic
Sportspeople from Brno